The 1994 Uzbek League season was the 3rd edition of top level football in Uzbekistan since independence from the Soviet Union in 1992.

Overview
It was contested by 16 teams, and Neftchi Farg'ona won the championship. Neftchi Farg'ona won the league title again for the third time and third in a row

On winning the championship, Neftchi also qualified for the 1995–96 Asian Club Championship edition. Neftchi also won the 1994 Uzbek Cup, which meant that no Uzbek team would be represented in the 1995–96 Asian Cup Winners' Cup.

Nurafshon Buxoro whom came runners up would enter the 1995 Commonwealth of Independent States Cup which would normally go to the league winners.

Guliston and Aral Nukus were relegated.

League standings

Match results

Top scorer

References
Uzbekistan - List of final tables (RSSSF)

Uzbekistan Super League seasons
1
Uzbek
Uzbek